The Missouri Valley League was an American minor league baseball league which operated from 1901 through 1905.

History
The Missouri Valley league formed in 1901 as an Independent league. The league consisted of teams in Kansas and Missouri: Columbus, Kansas, Fort Scott Memphis Route, Galena, Kansas, Joplin Colts, Monett Railroadmen, Nevada Reds, Oswego, Kansas and Pittsburg Coal Barons. 1901 league records and standings are unknown.

In 1902, The teams in Nevada, Missouri, Fort Scott, Kansas and Joplin, Missouri remained. Sedalia, Missouri; Coffeyville, Kansas; Jefferson City, Missouri; Iola, Kansas and Springfield, Missouri joined as the Missouri Valley League became designated as a Class D level league. On June 23, the Coffeyville Indians, with a 9-30 record, relocated to Chanute, Kansas, where they compiled a 32–51 record.

In the 1903 season, the teams in Chanute and Jefferson City folded. New teams in Leavenworth, Kansas, and Pittsburg, Kansas, formed and joined the league. The Nevada team, with a record of 21–39, relocated to Webb City, Missouri, on July 13, where their record was 0–4. The teams from Leavenworth and Webb City folded mid–season on July 16.

In 1904, new teams in Leavenworth, Kansas, and Topeka, Kansas, formed and joined the league. After the 1904 season, the Missouri Valley League essentially reformed under a different name as five member teams formed under a new league. Joplin, Leavenworth, Sedalia, Springfield, and Topeka all joined the new 1905 Western Association. The Iola franchise folded. The Fort Scott and Pittsburg franchises remained in the 1905 Class C level Missouri Valley League. In 1905, South McAlester moved to Ft. Smith on July 6. Muskogee disbanded on August 31, causing the Missouri Valley League to end on September 5.

Cities Represented 
Chanute, KS:Chanute Oilers 1902 
Columbus, KS: Columbus 1901
Coffeyville, KS: Coffeyville Indians 1902 
Fort Scott, KS: Fort Scott Memphis Route (1901); Fort Scott Giants 1902–1905
Fort Smith, AR: Fort Smith Giants 1905
Galena, KS: Galena 1901
Iola, KS: Iola Gasbags 1902; Iola Gaslighters 1903; Iola Gasbags 1904 
Jefferson City, MO: Jefferson City Convicts 1902 
Joplin, MO: Joplin Colts 1901; Joplin Miners 1902–1904
Leavenworth, KS: Leavenworth White Sox 1903; Leavenworth Orioles 1904
McAlester, OK: South McAlester Giants 1905
Monett, MO: Monett Railroadmen 1901
Muskogee, OK: Muskogee Reds 1905
Nevada, MO: Nevada Reds 1901; Nevada Lunatics 1902–1903 
Oswego, KS: Oswego 1901
Parsons, KS: Parsons Preachers 1905
Pittsburg, KS: Pittsburg Coal Barons 1901; Pittsburg Coal Diggers 1903–1904; Pittsburg Miners 
Sedalia, MO: Sedalia Gold Bugs 1902–1904
Springfield, MO: Springfield Reds 1902; Springfield Midgets 1903–1904 
Topeka, KS: Topeka Saints 1904 
Tulsa, OK: Tulsa Oilers 1905
Vinita, OK: Vinita Cherokees 1905
Webb City, MO: Webb City Goldbugs 1903, 1905

Teams & statistics

1902 Missouri Valley League
schedule
  Coffeyville (9–30) moved to Chanute June 23.

1903 Missouri Valley League
schedule
 Nevada (21–39) moved to Webb City July 13, then disbanded July 16; Leavenworth disbanded July 16.

1904 Missouri Valley League
schedule

1905 Missouri Valley League
schedule 
 Muskogee disbanded Aug 31, causing the season to be shortened to September 5. South McAlester moved to Ft. Smith July 6.

References

Further reading
Sumner, Benjamin Barrett.  Minor League Baseball Standings: All North American Leagues, Through 1999.  Jefferson, N.C.:McFarland. 

Defunct minor baseball leagues in the United States
Baseball leagues in Missouri
1901 establishments in the United States
1905 disestablishments in Missouri
Baseball leagues in Arkansas
Baseball leagues in Oklahoma
Baseball leagues in Kansas